The 1996–97 UEFA Champions League featured 24 teams, with eight teams (the seven top-ranked league champions in the UEFA clubs coefficient table, plus the defending champions from 1995–96) qualifying automatically for the group stage and the remaining 16 (the league champions ranked 8–23 in the coefficient table) playing in a two-legged preliminary round. The winners of each tie entered the Champions League group stage, while the losers entered the UEFA Cup First Round.

Summary

|}

Matches

First leg

Second leg

Fenerbahçe won 2–1 on aggregate.

Rangers won 10–3 on aggregate.

Rosenborg won 3–1 on aggregate.

IFK Göteborg won 4–1 on aggregate.

4–4 on aggregate. Widzew Łódź won on away goals.

Grasshopper won 6–0 on aggregate.

Steaua București won 5–2 on aggregate.

Rapid Wien won 6–2 on aggregate.

References

External links
Qualifying round at UEFA.com

Qualifying Round
1996-97